Joseph Dugas may refer to:

 Joseph Dugas (merchant) (1714–1779), merchant, privateer and militia officer of Acadian descent
 Joseph Louis Euclide Dugas (1861–1943), farmer and political figure in Quebec